The Alvah Horace Whitmarsh House was a historic house at 711 Pecan Street in Texarkana, Arkansas.  This -story wood-frame structure was one of the city's finest Queen Anne Victorians, located in a neighborhood that was fashionable at the turn of the 20th century.  The house had an elaborately decorated front porch and a three-story hexagonal tower, capped by a pointed roof, at its northeast corner.  The house was built in 1894 for Alvah Whitmarsh, a manager at the local Buchanan Lumber Company and a local leader in civic affairs.

The house was listed on the National Register of Historic Places in 1980. The house was destroyed by a fire on October 24, 2021.

See also
National Register of Historic Places listings in Miller County, Arkansas

References

Houses on the National Register of Historic Places in Arkansas
Victorian architecture in Arkansas
Queen Anne architecture in Arkansas
Houses completed in 1894
Houses in Miller County, Arkansas
Buildings and structures in Texarkana, Arkansas
National Register of Historic Places in Miller County, Arkansas